Eldon Anderson Money (November 7, 1930 – July 8, 2020) was an American politician who was a Democratic member of the Utah House of Representatives and Utah State Senate. An alumnus of Utah State University, he was a farmer and cattleman. Money served in the Utah National Guard for thirteen years. As of 2014, he is the last Democrat elected in Utah County, Utah to public office since he was defeated for re-election to the senate in 1996.

He died of Alzheimer's disease on July 8, 2020, in Mapleton, Utah at age 89.

References

1930 births
2020 deaths
Democratic Party members of the Utah House of Representatives
Democratic Party Utah state senators
People from Spanish Fork, Utah
Utah National Guard personnel
Utah State University alumni
Farmers from Utah
Ranchers from Utah
Neurological disease deaths in Utah
Deaths from Alzheimer's disease